Carinodrillia dichroa, common name the two-toned turrid, is a species of sea snail, a marine gastropod mollusk in the family Pseudomelatomidae.

Description
The length of the shell varies between 15 mm and 26 mm.

Distribution
This marine species occurs from the Sea of Cortez, West Mexico to Ecuador

References

 Pilsbry, Henry Augustus, and Herbert N. Lowe. "West Mexican and Central American mollusks collected by HN Lowe, 1929–31." Proceedings of the Academy of Natural Sciences of Philadelphia (1932): 33-144.

External links
 
 

dichroa
Gastropods described in 1932